The Australian Sumo Federation is the organization that currently governs sumo for men and women in Australia.

Structure
The national body has state and club member associations:

 Gold Coast Sumo Club
 Sydney Sumo Club
 Victorian Sumo Association
 Tasmanian Sumo Association

The main tournament they organise is the annual Australian National Sumo Championships and Oceania Sumo Championships.

References

External links
 

Sports governing bodies in Australia
Wrestling in Australia
1992 establishments in Australia
Sports organizations established in 1992
Sumo organizations
Japanese-Australian culture